Rachenahalli Lake is a lake in Bangalore, India.

References

Further reading 
Journals

 

Articles

 

 

Lakes of Bangalore